Clear Body, Clear Mind is a book published in 1990 by the Church of Scientology's publishing house Bridge Publications. It is credited to L. Ron Hubbard who died four years earlier, and is largely a compilation of material he wrote in the 1960s. It is one of the canonical texts of Scientology and mainly deals with the Purification Rundown ("Purif"). Scientologists believe this "detoxification" program, created by Hubbard, has unique medical and spiritual benefits, but has been criticized by medical professionals as "dangerous", "quackery," and "in some cases lethal".

Purification Rundown

The Purif consists of a "combination of exercise, vitamins, nutrition and sauna use," which purportedly "dislodges drug residues and other toxins from the fatty tissues so that these substances can then be eliminated from the body." Scientologists are expected to take the Purif as part of their spiritual progress, and it is also promoted in secular contexts via Scientology-related groups including Narconon, Criminon and Second Chance. It is promoted as a cure for conditions including cancer, AIDS, heart problems, kidney failure, liver disease and obesity. The procedure is viewed as dangerous by many medical professionals, as it calls for saunas and vitamins far in excess of safe levels. Side effects listed by Scientology include dehydration, electrolyte disturbances including hyponatremia (low sodium level) & hypokalemia (low potassium level), and heat-related illnesses. Some families have sued the Church of Scientology, claiming that the Purif was responsible for the death of a relative.

Medical claims

Clear Body, Clear Mind includes a disclaimer to the effect that the Purification Rundown is not a medical treatment and that it should not be read as making medical claims. However, in their Introduction to the book, David Root M.D. and James Barnes write: 
L. Ron Hubbard's Purification program remains the only proven and safe method for reducing or eliminating chemical residues from the body. It has been used to alleviate the symptoms and concerns of people exposed to radiation. With each year, the importance of this discovery to every man, woman and child on this planet becomes more evident.

Hubbard claims to have been the discoverer of the "acid flashback" phenomenon, in which LSD is said to lodge itself in tissues and re-enter the bloodstream years later. He claims to have made this discovery "In the 1970s, working with cases of individuals who had been drug users". (pg. 23, 1990 hardcover edition)

Scientology's official website says of the book: 
<blockquote> "Pesticides, solar radiation, drug and environmental toxins have become increasingly pervasive in today's society. They damage not just your health, but your personality and your ability to think clearly. Clear Body, Clear Mind -'The Effective Purification Program''', by L. Ron Hubbard, details his groundbreaking discoveries in this field. Discover the world's only all-natural, proven program to eliminate drug and toxic residues lodged in the fatty tissues of your body. Over 250,000 have done this program with spectacular success."  </blockquote>

The claim of "Over 250,000" successes drew censure from the UK's Advertising Standards Authority. The figure was a count of everyone who had completed the program, including people whose "drug" exposure was infrequent use of alcoholic drinks or prescription drugs.

A 1995 review of the book at a medical conference described the mega-doses of niacin as inappropriate, especially since they cause the release of histamine, which is counterproductive when dealing with chemical sensitivity.

Related books
In All About Radiation, Hubbard (1957) sets out his idiosyncratic theories of radiation, including the idea that large doses of vitamins could both alleviate and prevent radiation sickness.Purification: An Illustrated Answer To Drugs (New Era Publications, 1984. ) is an earlier, illustrated explanation of the Purification Rundown. Another illustrated book, Narconon New Life Detoxification Program: the effective purification program by L. Ron Hubbard. (Bridge Publications, 1991. ) is listed as based on Clear Body, Clear Mind''.

See also
 Downtown Medical
 Scientology bibliography
 Mens sana in corpore sano

Notes

References

External links

Publishers' sites
 www.clearbodyclearmind.com Official Site.
 www.asdegasdgasdcasdgt4.org International Academy of Detoxification Specialists. 
 www.chernobyl.info Tschernobyl - Information Detoxification Program.

Critical sites
 Stop Narconon Critical commentary on the book's introduction by Dr Dave Touretzky

Books published by the Church of Scientology
1990 non-fiction books
Non-fiction works by L. Ron Hubbard
Alternative detoxification
Books published posthumously